Sarah Joelle Gregorius (born 6 August 1987), is an association football player who has represented New Zealand at international level. She plays for AFC Amsterdam since august 2021.

International career
Gregorius was a member of the New Zealand side at the 2006 FIFA U-20 Women's World Championship playing in all three games at the finals in Russia, where they lost to Australia (0–3) and Russia (2–3), before holding Brazil to a goalless draw.

She made her senior Football Ferns debut in a 14–0 win over Vanuatu in the Oceania Women's Nations Cup on 29 September 2010. She scored her first senior international goal in her second appearance as she claimed a hat-trick in a 10–0 win over Cook Islands on 1 October 2010.

She played all New Zealand's matches at both the 2011 FIFA Women's World Cup in Germany and 2015 FIFA Women's World Cup in Canada, 6 matches overall (3 in each tournament).

Gregorius scored a goal against England in a friendly match on June 1st 2019, helping New Zealand win 1–0.

She was part of New Zealand's 2012 and 2016 Olympic teams. She also played in the 2019 FIFA Women's World Cup in France.

On 4 March 2020, Gregorius played her 100th match for New Zealand against Belgium in the 2020 Algarve Cup, when she also announced her retirement from international football.

International goals

Club career
In July 2013, Gregorius signed for FA WSL league-leaders Liverpool from German Frauen-Bundesliga club SC 07 Bad Neuenahr.

Honours

Club
 Liverpool
 Women's Super League (1): 2013

Individual
 IFFHS OFC Woman Team of the Decade 2011–2020

References

External links
 
 Profile at NZF
 Profile  at AS Elfen Saitama
 

1987 births
Living people
New Zealand women's association footballers
2011 FIFA Women's World Cup players
2015 FIFA Women's World Cup players
Footballers at the 2012 Summer Olympics
Olympic association footballers of New Zealand
SC 07 Bad Neuenahr players
Liverpool F.C. Women players
Expatriate women's footballers in Germany
Expatriate women's footballers in England
Expatriate women's footballers in Japan
New Zealand expatriate sportspeople in Germany
New Zealand expatriate sportspeople in England
New Zealand expatriate sportspeople in Japan
Sportspeople from Lower Hutt
Women's association football forwards
New Zealand women's international footballers
Footballers at the 2016 Summer Olympics
2019 FIFA Women's World Cup players
FIFA Century Club
New Zealand expatriate women's association footballers